Luigi Arnaldo Vasallo (31 October 1852 - 10 August 1906) was an Italian writer, journalist, and editor.

Biography 
He was born in Genoa. In Rome, along with Raffaello Giovagnoli, he helped found and edit the journals Capitan Fracassa. He would later publish the journals Don Chisciotte, Folchetta, and in Genoa founded the political satirical journal Secolo XIX. He often wrote under the pseudonym of Gandolin. Among his works are La regina Margherita (romance 1882); Anticolerico Fracassa (1886), Dianna ricattatrice, Temporale di maggio (1893); La Signora Cagliostro (1894) Guerra in tempo di bagni (1896), and La famiglia De Tapetti (1904).

Note

1856 births
1905 deaths
Italian journalists
19th-century Italian writers
20th-century Italian writers